Christopher Derek Foley, commonly known as KiddChris. (AKA Foley / Cobra / The Chris) (born 1974) is an American radio host. He has hosted radio shows in several cities since 1998.

The radio show originated in his hometown of Syracuse, New York. His controversial radio show made its way to Wichita, Kansas (KICT T-95FM, KDGS Power 93.9FM, KANR FLY 92.7FM), which raised the ire of local church groups. Many religious organizations attempted to band together and remove KiddChris from the airwaves, but he remained on the air.

Chris then moved to Sacramento, California, where he hosted a morning show on a hip-hop station KSFM. After several months, he moved into an evening show on the sister FM talk station KXOA. KiddChris's four-hour talk show was one of the highest-rated radio shows on the Pacific coast. While in Sacramento, Chris gained national attention by sending a series of prank phone calls made to O. J. Simpson to the popular Opie and Anthony and Howard Stern nationally syndicated shows and Thomas Kitajima eventually joined the show in Sacramento.

In the fall of 2002, KiddChris took a hiatus from radio and retired to upstate New York. There, he rejuvenated himself and prepared for his return, which occurred on the morning of January 5, 2004, in San Antonio, Texas. He hosted a highly rated show at San Antonio's KSRX K-Rock until early August 2005.

Philadelphia developments
KiddChris signed with Philadelphia rock station WYSP and The KiddChris Show began broadcasting on Monday, August 29, 2005. While Chris made remarks that the show was "gay" and that "it'll be gone in six months," this incarnation of his show lasted for over two years, and the station exercised their right to extend his contract for one more.

On August 21, 2006, it was announced that The KiddChris Show had been syndicated to a rock station in Pittsburgh, Pennsylvania. The show entered syndication on August 28, 2006.

On September 13, 2007, the Philadelphia station announced a format change from all talk to a rock/talk hybrid. The official change, which left KiddChris on during the drive-time hours of 3pm-7pm, was announced during the KiddChris Show. Moments before the announcement, Chris, with Opie and Anthony in-studio, commented that "It would be a hoot if they fired us live right after the big announcement." After announcing the format change, the station dropped to music and The KiddChris Show did not return to the air, causing confusion on multiple listener-run message boards as to their fate. On September 14, 2007, Chris appeared on The Opie and Anthony show and there was no mentioning of a firing.

The show returned to the air on September 17, 2007, but with old recordings in-between music, leaving fans of the show confused as to its fate. Soon after, Chris stated that they needed to "establish the rock first. The show WILL be back", which confirmed the statements made by other sources that the show will be returning to its original form.

On the Howard Stern Show on October 22, 2007, KiddChris called in to discuss Bruce Springsteen and Billy Joel. Howard quickly turned the topic of conversation to Chris' employment at the station, claiming a "pretty good source" told him Chris would take over the morning slot from Opie and Anthony relatively soon. Chris had no comment on the rumor.

On October 23, 2007, the Philadelphia rock station ended their syndication of Opie and Anthony's morning show. There was no mention of it on-air by Chris. KiddChris ended his show that night unexpectedly with Journey 's "Don't Stop Believin'." He has stated on-air in the past that if anything were to "go down" in regards to the show, he would play that song (though he originally claimed the song would play in the background and he would continue on as if nothing was happening). No morning or afternoon show aired for about a month.

On November 6, 2007, KiddChris was called by possible evening DJ Tic-Tac about his future with the station. In so many words, he stated that he "will be back", but claimed not to know when or in what time slot. Callers asked whether he was joining the Howard Stern Show staff and he said that would be impossible since he is staying in Philadelphia. He reminded fans that if he was fired, he would no longer be featured on the website.

During the week of November 18, 2007, Chris's website was changed to a countdown with the tagline "Are You Ready?", set to end on Monday, November 26 at 6 AM. The countdown also appeared on his MySpace page. Prior to this, the station began to air short recordings featuring the "Are You Ready?" tagline, as well as the opening of "The Game" by Motörhead (the theme song of The KiddChris Show). The recordings varied; they included short clips from the show, clips from Brad the Cripple interviews, recordings of callers asking what happened to the show and if he was going to return in the mornings and Howard Stern discussing the future of KiddChris in morning drive. However, there was no official voiceover to these clips, no direct mention of "The KiddChris Show" or any date of return.

The KiddChris Show officially returned to the airwaves on Monday, November 26, 2007, at 6 AM EST. Philadelphia Inquirer reporter Michael Klein reported in his Sunday column of the show’s return. The move to the morning slot was notable for a few reasons. It replaced the Opie and Anthony Show. In January, the show was second to rival Philadelphia morning show hosts Preston and Steve among men ages 18–34.

In May 2008, KiddChris was fired over a guest's racist parody song (three months after it was aired.) Also fired was program director John Cook.

Post Philadelphia developments
After Foley's firing, he then hosted his own internet radio show for several months in 2009 until his transfer to KUFO in Portland, Oregon.

KiddChris announced in May 2011 on the Howard Stern Show that he was bringing his morning show to WKLS "Project 9-6-1" in Atlanta.

Project 9-6-1 was discontinued in August 2012.

In October 2012, he began to host mornings at WEBN in Cincinnati. As of September 2022, he remains at WEBN and it is his longest tenure in any city/station.

Current staff 
 KiddChris – Host
 Allie Martin – Co-Host. Joined the show March 2022

Show regulars 
 Constantine - Whose trademark stutter and ignorance of the current on-air conversation are used for laughs. He is featured almost daily after gaining prominence in late 2005. Constantine on Twitter
 Country Jeff - A drunken drifter from the streets of Cincinnati. Jeff will also promote where he will be panhandling for beer money. 
 The Wolfpack - A group of bullies are known for prank calling other radio shows, news radio stations, and TV news broadcasts.
 Uncle Milt - A 80yr old stand-up comic from Philly that enjoys calling in and sharing his new silly jokes with the world.
 Drunk Barry - Drunk caller located in Cincinnati, OH, who calls and asks for tickets on a regular basis.
 Beth - Is an old drunk lady located in Cincinnati, OH, who is the girlfriend of Drunk Barry.
 Johnny Five - 26-time Special Olympics Medalist located in Cincinnati, OH. Johnny is a local professional street wrestler. Johnny enjoys making viral videos challenging people (and things) to fights.
 Adrian Mark Montgomery - A regular caller who claims his nickname in jail was “Butt Cheeks”. Adrian normally gets upset with KiddChris and normally threatens him before ending the conversation.
 Avalanche Bob 33 (Died 2019) - Inventor of "Snowboard Punk".  His music has been played on the show numerous times.
 Larry From High School (Died 2017) - A man who calls KiddChris "Cobra" (from G.I. Joe) and almost always reminisces with Chris about times in high school. Chris has gone on record saying he has never met Larry from High School in his entire life.

Former staff 
  Thomas - He served as the Executive Producer of the show. He is from Sacramento.  He's afraid of snakes and insects. His mother was the butt of prank calls.
Open Mike - Former sidekick/stunt man. He was previously selling counterfeit baseball caps for a living in San Antonio, Texas, and was a stand-up comedian (although his material bombed at almost every gig): hence, the name 'Open Mike'. His comedy was often greeted with dead silence. Open Mike quit the show in June 2006, to return to his unemployed lifestyle. 
  Rock Hard Killa - Answered the phones and harassed celebs. 
  Metro  - Executive Producer.
  Munk  - Technical Producer. Writer.
  DJ EggNog  - Assistant Producer. Sound effects guy.
  Vinnie the Crumb - Sports Reporter.
 Dubs - Assistant producer and show audio producer. Responsible for laughing at inappropriate times and his cheesy song parodies and prank calls. Known for wearing "mom jeans" and dating a woman in a wheelchair.
 Meat - The show jock. Has had several puppies that died. Meat drinks and parties like he's in his late 30's still. Meat is originally from Cincinnati, Ohio.

References

External links

KiddChris Internet radio show website
KiddChris's channel on YouTube

1974 births
Living people
American radio DJs